The 1991 London Marathon was the 11th running of the annual marathon race in London, United Kingdom, which took place on Sunday, 21 April. The elite men's race was won by Soviet athlete Yakov Tolstikov in a time of 2:09:17 hours and the women's race was won by Portugal's Rosa Mota in 2:26:14. Tolstikov's run was a Soviet record, which was never bettered as the country collapsed at the end of 1991.

The elite race featured high levels of international participation that year as it played host to the 1991 World Marathon Cup, where Great Britain won the men's team race and the Soviet Union won the women's team race.

In the wheelchair races, France's Farid Amarouche (1:52:52) and Denmark's Connie Hansen (2:04:40) set course records in the men's and women's divisions, respectively. This was the first time that the winning time in the women's wheelchair race surpassed that of both able-bodied races.

In the mass race, around 79,000 people applied to enter the race, of which 33,485 had their applications accepted and around 24,500 started the race. A total of 23,435 runners finished the race.

Results

Men

Women

Wheelchair men

Wheelchair women

References

Results
Results. Association of Road Racing Statisticians. Retrieved 2020-04-19.

External links

Official website

1991
London Marathon
Marathon
London Marathon